Scott Glosserman is an American film director.

Filmography

Awards and nominations

References

External links

 

American film directors
Living people
Year of birth missing (living people)